The following scientific events occurred in 2022.

Events

January

 6 January
The global atmospheric methane concentration exceeds 1,900 parts per billion (ppb) for the first time in human history.
 10 January
The first successful xenogeneic heart transplant, from a genetically modified pig to a human patient, is reported in the United States.
 Researchers build upon previous studies documenting biodiversity loss to confirm that a sixth mass extinction event, entirely caused by anthropogenic activity, is currently underway.
A study quantifies climate change mitigation potentials of 'high-income' nations shifting diets – away from meat-consumption – and restoration of the spared land.
 11 January
The first known deformation of an exoplanet is detected by the CHEOPS mission, which finds that WASP-103b is being strongly influenced by its parent star's close proximity, making the planet shaped like an ellipsoid instead of a sphere.
A study reports the likely detection of an extreme SEP event that hit Earth ~9000 years ago and, unlike known Solar storms, unexpectedly happened near a Solar minimum.

 18 January
Europe's first quantum annealer with more than 5,000 qubits is launched in Jülich, Germany.
A study suggests and defines a 'planetary boundary' for novel entities such as plastic- and chemical pollution and finds that it has been crossed.
A study for the first time attempts to assess and quantify complete societal costs of cars (i.e. car-use, etc).
Microbiologists demonstrate an individually adjusted phage-antibiotic combination as an antimicrobial resistance treatment, calling for scaling up the research and further development of this approach.

 19 January
In a first global assessment, scientists report, based on medical records, that antibiotic resistance may have contributed to ~4.95 million deaths (1.3 M directly attributed) in 2019, more than e.g. AIDS. Increased antibiotic use during the COVID-19 pandemic may exacerbate this global health challenge.
A report recommends a number of measures such as, broadly described, building resilience to scientific misinformation and a healthy online information environment and not having offending content removed.
 24 January
 A chip with molecular circuit components in single-molecule (bio)sensors is demonstrated.
 The James Webb Space Telescope arrives at its destination, Lagrange Point 2.

February

March

April

1 April
Biochemists report finishing the complete sequence of the human genome.
A study shows that, contrary to widespread belief, body sizes of mammal extinction survivors of the dinosaur-times extinction event were the first to evolutionarily increase, with brain sizes increasing later in the Eocene.
4 April
The Intergovernmental Panel on Climate Change (IPCC) releases the third and final part of its Sixth Assessment Report on climate change, warning that greenhouse gas emissions must peak before 2025 at the latest and decline 43% by 2030, in order to likely limit global warming to 1.5 °C (2.7 °F).
Researchers announce a new technique for accelerating the development of vaccines and other pharmaceutical products by up to a million times, using much smaller quantities based on DNA nanotechnology.
Alzheimer's disease (AD) research progress:A study reports 42 new genes linked to an increased risk of AD. Researchers report a potential primary mechanism of sleep disturbance as an early-stage effect of neurodegenerative diseases. Researchers identify several genes associated with changes in brain structure over lifetime and potential AD therapy-targets (5 Apr).

5 April
COVID-19 pandemic: Preclinical data for a new vaccine developed at the Medical University of Vienna indicates it is effective against all SARS-CoV-2 variants known to date, including Omicron.
A study presents a mechanism by which the hypothesized potential dark-energy-explaining quintessence, if true, would smoothly cause the accelerating expansion of the Universe to inverse to contraction, possibly within the cosmic near-future (100 My) given current data. It concludes that its end-time scenario theory fits "naturally with cyclic cosmologies [(each a theory of cycles of universe originations and ends, rather than the theories of one Big Bang beginning of the Universe/multiverse, to which authors were major contributors)] and recent conjectures about quantum gravity".

 6 April
U.S. Space Command, based on information collected from its planetary defense sensors, confirms the detection of the first known interstellar object. The purported interstellar meteorite, technically known as CNEOS 2014-01-08, impacted Earth in 2014, and was determined, based on its hyperbolic trajectory and estimated initial high velocity, to be from beyond the Solar System. The 2014 meteorite was detected three years earlier than the more recent and widely known interstellar objects, ʻOumuamua in 2017 and  2I/Borisov in 2019. 
The first known dinosaur fossil linked to the very day of the Chicxulub impact is reported by paleontologists at the Tanis site in North Dakota.
One science journalist reflects on the global management of the COVID-19 pandemic in relation to science, investigating the question "Why the WHO took two years to say COVID is airborne" – a finding hundreds of scientists reaffirmed in an open letter in July 2020 – with one indication that this may be one valid major concern to many expert scientists being several writings published by news outlets.
A study decodes electrical communication between fungi into word-like components via spiking characteristics.
Researchers demonstrate semi-automated testing for reproducibility (which is lacking especially in cancer research) via extraction of statements about experimental results in, as of 2022 non-semantic, gene expression cancer research papers and subsequent testing with breast cancer cell lines via robot scientist "Eve".

7 April
Astronomers report the discovery of HD1, considered to be the earliest and most distant known galaxy yet identified in the observable universe, located only about 330 million years after the Big Bang 13.8 billion years ago, a light-travel distance of 13.5 billion light-years from Earth, and, due to the expansion of the universe, a present proper distance of 33.4 billion light-years.
Physicists from the Collider Detector at Fermilab determine the mass of the W boson with a precision of 0.01%. The result hints at a flaw in the Standard Model.
A trial of estimated financial energy cost of refrigerators alongside EU energy-efficiency class (EEEC) labels online finds that the approach of labels involves a trade-off between financial considerations and higher cost requirements in effort or time for the product-selection from the many available options which are often unlabelled and don't have any EEEC-requirement for being bought, used or sold within the EU.
8 April
Bioresearchers demonstrate an in vitro method for rejuvenation (including the transcriptome and epigenome) reprogramming in which fibroblast skin cells temporarily lose their cell identity.
Researchers show air pollution in fast-growing tropical cities caused ~0.5 million earlier deaths in 2018 with a substantial recent and projected rise, proposing "regulatory action targeting emerging anthropogenic sources".
11 April – A study confirms antidepressant potential of psilocybin therapy protocols (which use the active ingredient in psilocybin mushrooms), providing fMRI data about a correlated likely major effect mechanism – global increases in brain network integration.
12 April – Science and the 2022 Russian invasion of Ukraine:An editorial in a scientific journal reports that relevant areas of food system research are patchy and lack independent assessments. An editorial projects significant gender and age imbalance in the population in Ukraine as a substantial problem if most refugees, as in other cases, do not return over time (4 Apr). A preprint reports impacts of the Ukrainian power grid synchronization with Continental Europe (15 Apr).

14 April
GNz7q, a distant starburst galaxy, is reported as being a "missing link" between supermassive black holes and the evolution of quasars.
A study describes the impact of climate change on the survival of cacti. It finds that 60% of species will experience a reduction in favourable climate by 2050–2070, with epiphytes having the greatest exposure to increased warming.
A preprint demonstrates how backdoors can be placed undetectably into classifying (e.g. posts as "spam" or well-visible "not spam") machine learning models which are often developed and/or trained by third parties. Parties can change the classification of any input, including in cases with types of data/software transparency, possibly including white-box access.

16 April – A review suggests that global prevalence of long COVID conditions after infection could be as high as 43%, with the most common symptoms being fatigue and memory problems.
19 April – NASA publishes its Planetary Science Decadal Survey for 2023-2032. The future mission recommendations include a Uranus orbiter (the first visit to the planet since 1986) and the Enceladus Orbilander (landing in the early 2050s).
20 April
Micronovae, a previously unknown class of thermonuclear explosions on the surface of white dwarfs, are described for the first time.
A study shows that common single-use plastic products – such as paper coffee cups that are lined with a thin plastic film inside – release trillions of microplastics-nanoparticles per liter into water during normal use.
21 April – Researchers discover that humans are interrupting a 66-million-years-old feature of ecosystems, the relationship between diet and body mass, by driving the largest vertebrate animals towards extinction, which they suggest could have unpredictable consequences.
22 April
The Large Hadron Collider recommences full operations, three years after being shut down for upgrades.
Scientists suggest in a study that space governance of satellites/space debris should regulate the current free externalization of true costs and risks, with orbital space around the Earth being an "additional ecosystem" which should be subject to regulations as e.g. oceans on Earth.
Cancer research progress:The largest study of whole cancer genomes reports 58 new mutational signatures and shows that for each organ "cancers have a limited number of common signatures and a long tail of rare signatures". A study reports presence of certain bacteria in the prostate and urine for aggressive forms of prostate cancer, with biomarker- and therapeutic potentials being unclear (18 Apr).
25 April
Novel foods such as under-development cultured meat, existing microbial foods and ground-up insects are shown to have the potential to reduce environmental impacts by over 80% in a study.
A review about meat and sustainability of food systems, animal welfare, and healthy nutrition concludes that its consumption has to be reduced substantially for sustainable consumption and names broad potential measures such as "restrictions or fiscal mechanisms".
A new type of cell death 'erebosis' is reported after copper-dependent cell death was first reported the previous month.
26 April
Scientists report the detection of purine and pyrimidine nucleobases in several meteorites, including guanine, adenine, cytosine, uracil and thymine, and claim that such meteoritic nucleobases could serve as "building blocks of DNA and RNA on the early Earth".
The Global Carbon Budget 2021 concludes that fossil  emissions rebounded by around +4.8% relative to 2020 emissions – returning to 2019 levels, identifies three major issues for improving reliable accuracy of monitoring, shows that China and India surpassed 2019 levels (by 5.7% and 3.2%) while the EU and the US stayed beneath 2019 levels (by 5.3% and 4.5%), quantifies various changes and trends, for the first time provides models' estimates that are linked to the official country GHG inventories reporting, and shows that the remaining carbon budget at 1. Jan 2022 for a 50% likelihood to limit global warming to 1.5 °C is 120 GtC (420 Gt) – or 11 years of 2021 emissions levels.
A study published one day earlier integrates "green water" along with "blue water" into an index to measure and project water scarcity in agriculture for climate change scenarios.
27 April
A lineage of H3N8 bird flu is found to infect humans for the first time, with a case reported in the Henan province of China. Months earlier, H5 strain bird flu viruses (HPAIv) have been detected in Canada and the US.
A study extends global assessments of shares of species threatened by extinction with reptiles, which often play functional roles in their respective ecosystems, indicating at least 21% are threatened by extinction. One day later, scientists quantify global and local mass extinction risks of marine life from climate change and conservation potentials.
Researchers report routes for recycling 200 industrial waste chemicals into important drugs and agrochemicals using a software for computer-aided chemical synthesis design, helping enable "circular chemistry" as a potential area of a circular economy.
28 April
A comprehensive review reaffirms likely beneficial health effects with links to health/life extension of cycles of caloric restriction and intermittent fasting as well as reducing meat consumption in humans. It identifies issues with contemporary nutrition research approaches, proposing a multi-pillar approach, and summarizes findings towards constructing – multi-system-considering and at least age-personalized dynamic – refined longevity diets and proposes inclusion of such in standard preventive healthcare.
A company reports results of a phase 3 clinical trial, indicating that tirzepatide could be used for substantial weight loss – possibly larger than the, as of 2022 also expensive, semaglutide approved by the FDA in 2021 – in obese people.
Researchers publish projections for interspecies viral sharing, that can lead to novel viral spillovers, due to ongoing climate change-caused range-shifts of mammals (mostly bats) for use in efforts of pandemic prevention.

May

1 May
A preprint indicates Omicron subvariants BA.4 and BA.5 can cause a large share of reinfections, beyond the increase of reinfections caused by the Omicron lineage, even for people who were infected by Omicron BA.1 due to increases in immune evasion, especially for the unvaccinated. On 18 May, a study shows that immunity from an Omicron infection for unvaccinated and previously uninfected is weak "against non-Omicron variants".
A preprint suggests that SARS-CoV-2 antibodies in or transmitted through the air are an unrecognized mechanism by which, transferred, passive immune protection occurs. However, if not sustained, protection from passive herd immunity is thought to wane over the course of weeks to months.
4 May
NASA reports the sonification (converting astronomical data associated with pressure waves into sound) of the black hole at the center of the Perseus galaxy cluster.
A single master gene that programs ear hair cells into either outer or inner ones is discovered, overcoming a major hurdle that had prevented the development of these cells to reverse hearing loss.
A study complements life-cycle assessment studies, showing substantial deforestation reduction (56%) and climate change mitigation if only  of per-capita beef was replaced by microbial protein by 2050.
A study suggests, using an epidemiological model, that by reducing the transferred viral load, face masks against COVID19 may be beneficial for variolation whereby "smaller infectious doses tend to yield milder infections, yet ultimately induce similar levels of immunity".
5 May
The monthly average carbon dioxide level in Earth's atmosphere exceeds 420 parts per million (ppm) for the first time in recorded history.
A new approach to reverse of neuropathic pain is demonstrated in animals – a gene therapy for local transgenes encoding for (releasing) GABA which is effective for months at a time.
A study demonstrates that a 30% caloric restriction extended life spans of male C57BL/6J mice by 10% but when combined with daily intermittent fasting and eating during the most active time of the day it extended life span by 35%.

6 May
Scientists report the discovery of 830 million year old microorganisms in fluid inclusions within halite that may, potentially, still be alive. According to the researchers, "This study has implications for the search for life in both terrestrial and extraterrestrial chemical sedimentary rocks."
Low butyrylcholinesterase specific activity is identified as a potential biomarker for infants at risk for sudden infant death syndrome in a small crowd-funded study.
8 May – The UK's Met Office warns, with WMO affirmation, that the probability of global average temperatures reaching 1.5°C above pre-industrial levels over the next five years is now almost 50:50 (48%). It also predicts a more than 90% chance that a new record high will occur in at least one year from 2022-2026.
9 May
A study reports that declining numbers of the largest fish on Earth, the endangered whale shark, may be linked to collisions with large vessels in the global transport fleet.
News outlets report about the first global, interactive AI- and satellite monitoring-based, map and analysis of plastic waste sites to help prevention of plastic pollution, especially ocean pollution.
10 May – A sixth mass bleaching event is recorded at the Great Barrier Reef, with 91% of corals affected.

11 May
A logic gate for computation at femtosecond timescales is demonstrated.
A study shows that infusing the nourishing cerebrospinal fluid from around brain cells of young mice into aged brains rejuvenates aspects of the brain, identifying FGF17 as a key target for potential therapeutics such as of anti-aging.
Scientists close a missing link in the potential origin of life from a RNA world – synergistic formation of peptides and ever-longer RNAs or peptide-decorated RNA, leading to a protein world.
A study suggests that in children at age 8–12 during two years, time gaming or watching digital videos can be positively correlated with measures intelligence, albeit correlations with overall screen time (including social media, socializing and TV) were not investigated and 'time gaming' did not differentiate between categories of video games (e.g. shares of games' platform and genre).
12 May
Sagittarius A*, the supermassive black hole at the center of the Milky Way galaxy, is imaged for the first time by the Event Horizon Telescope team.
Researchers report that lunar soil has been used to grow plants for the first time.
Researchers identify the 425 biggest fossil fuel extraction projects globally, of which 40% as of 2020 are new projects that haven't yet started extraction. They conclude that "defusing" these "carbon bombs" – worked on by only "few actors" to date – would be necessary for climate change mitigation of global climate goals. On 17 May, a separate study finds that "staying within a 1.5 °C carbon budget (50% probability) implies leaving almost 40% of 'developed reserves' of fossil fuels unextracted". On 26 May, a study calculates climate policies-induced future lost financial profits from global stranded fossil-fuel assets.
17 May
Isotopically pure silicon-28 nanowires are shown to conduct heat 150% better than regular silicon, with potential for improved cooling of computer chips.
According to reports, the partly-public 2022 United States Congress hearings on UFOs may result in the UAP issue being approached more seriously, such as for a scientific public pursuit for answers and an increased interest from scientists. Known ongoing scientific research is conducted by non-profit groups of researchers that use or develop expensive equipment for new high-quality data rather than analyzing or systematically organizing public data.
A review concludes that, like in 2015, pollution (¾ from air pollution) was responsible for 9 million premature deaths in 2019 (one in six deaths). It concludes that little real progress against pollution can be identified and outlines needs for attention and action such as a "formal science–policy interface".
A trial shows that Urolithin A can improve muscle strength, exercise performance, and biomarkers of mitochondrial health.
18 May
NASA reports that the Voyager 1 spacecraft, the farthest human-made object, is sending data that does not reflect what is happening on board with the antenna apparently remaining in its prescribed orientation to Earth. On 17 June, it was reported that NASA is preparing to power down the two Voyager spacecraft in the hope of using the remaining power to extend their operation to about 2030.
A study shows how a Twin-world models cosmological model – already extensively studied to find out why gravity appears much weaker than other known forces – could explain the Hubble constant (H0) tension via interactions between the two worlds. The "mirror world" would contain copies of all existing fundamental particles. On 2 May, another twin/pair-world or "bi-worlds" cosmology is shown to theoretically be able to solve the cosmological constant (Λ) problem, closely related to dark energy: two interacting worlds with a large Λ each resulting in a small shared effective Λ. Previous similar models e.g. attempt to explain the baryon asymmetry – why there was more matter than antimatter at the beginning – with a mirror anti-universe.

19 May 
Scientists report that RNA was found to be formed spontaneously on prebiotic basalt lava glass which is presumed to have been abundantly available on the early Earth.
 The yellow-billed hornbill of southern Africa, famous for its role in Disney's The Lion King, is reported to be at risk of extinction due to rising temperatures in the region.
 Boeing starts the one-week second uncrewed test flight of its Starliner space capsule in advance of its first crewed test flight later in 2022.
A study estimates losses of 61 metals to help the development of circular economy strategies, showing that usespans of, often scarce, tech-critical metals are short.
20 May – Global warming is projected to substantially erode sleep worldwide.

21 May
Graphyne is reported to be synthesised for the first time.
The WHO informs about the international 2022 monkeypox outbreak in non-endemic countries – an unprecedented number of cases detected outside of Africa after the first of these cases was detected on 6 May. On 24 May, the WHO states that the outbreak can be contained. The main method used for the early containment is 'ring vaccination' – vaccinating close contacts of positive cases via existing vaccines.
23 May
Researchers report that CRISPR-Cas9 gene editing has been used to boost vitamin D in tomatoes.
A study shows why decarbonization must be accompanied by strategies to reduce the levels of short-lived climate pollutants with near-term effects for climate goals.
24 May
Scientists report the first 3D-printed lab-grown wood. It is unclear if it could ever be used on a commercial scale (e.g. with sufficient production efficiency and quality).
A CDC study based on electronic health records shows that "one in five COVID-19 survivors aged 18–64 years and one in four survivors aged ≥65 years experienced at least one incident condition that might be attributable to previous COVID-19" or long COVID. On 18 May, an analysis of private healthcare claims shows that of 78,252 patients diagnosed with 'long COVID', 75.8% had not been hospitalized for COVID-19.
25 May – The world's smallest remote-controlled walking robot, measuring just half a millimetre wide, is demonstrated. Potential applications include the clearing of blocked arteries.
26 May – A climate change study reveals that storms in the Southern Hemisphere have already reached intensity levels previously predicted to occur only in the year 2080.

27 May
A new compact CRISPR gene editing tool better suited for therapeutic (temporary) RNA editing than Cas13 is reported, Cas7-11, – of which an early version was used for in vitro editing in 2021.
Science and the 2022 Russian invasion of Ukraine:According to a news report academics in Russia are compiling or circulating a list of researchers who have supported Russia's invasion to prevent them from being elected to the Russian Academy of Sciences. An editorial published in a journal notes that remote surgery and types of videoconferencing for sharing expertise (e.g. ad hoc assistance) have been and could be used to support doctors in Ukraine (3 May). A forum contribution analyzes Russian users' reactions to the Bucha massacre on social media – on nationalist Telegram channels (9 May). The FAO estimates that "at least 20 percent of Ukraine's winter crops" "may not be harvested or planted" (13 May). A preprint estimates potential impacts of the EU embargoing fossil fuels from Russia, suggesting implementing such via a partial embargo with tariffs may be beneficial (25 May).
28 May – A new direct air capture system using isophorone diamine is demonstrated, able to remove carbon dioxide with 99% efficiency and more than twice as fast as existing systems.
30 May – Frontier is announced by Oak Ridge National Laboratory as the world's first exascale supercomputer.
31 May – Success of record-long (3 days rather than usually <12 hours) of human transplant organ preservation with machine perfusion of a liver is reported. It could possibly be extended to 10 days and prevent substantial cell damage by low temperature preservation methods. On the same day, a separate study reports new cryoprotectant solvents, tested with cells, that could preserve organs by the latter methods for much longer with substantially reduced damage.

June

1 June – A study shows the clonal diversity of stem cells that produce blood cells gets drastically reduced around age 70 , substantiating a novel theory of ageing which could enable healthy aging.
2 June – First success of a clinical trial for a 3D bioprinted transplant, an external ear to treat microtia, that is made from the patient's own cells is reported.
3 June – The NOAA reports that the global concentration of carbon dioxide in Earth's atmosphere is now 50% greater than in pre-industrial times, and is likely at a level last seen 4.1 to 4.5 million years ago, at 421 parts per million (ppm).
5 June – Progress in the treatment of cancer:A very small trial shows complete remission of a type of colorectal cancer without surgery and radiation in all 12 patients. On the same day, results of a trial show that trastuzumab deruxtecan therapy for HER2-low metastatic breast cancer exceeded results from chemotherapy. The synthesis of ERX-41, a novel compound that has shown promise in eliminating cancer cells, is reported (2 June). Researchers describe a new light-activated 'photoimmunotherapy' for brain cancer in vitro. They believe it could join surgery, chemotherapy, radiotherapy and immunotherapy as a fifth major form of cancer treatment (16 June).
6 June – Cats are added to the list of animals that can get SARS-CoV-2 and spread it back to humans, albeit the transmission is considered uncommon and not to be a source of variants of concern since the August 2021 detection.

8 June
It was incorrectly reported in some press releases as a dark matter particle.
Scientists provide an overview of the capabilities of missions and observatories for detecting various alien technosignatures.
9 June
A study estimates the air pollution impacts on climate change and the ozone layer from rocket launches and re-entry of reusable components and debris in 2019 and from a theoretical future space industry extrapolated from the "billionaire space race". It concludes that substantial effects from routine space tourism should "motivate regulation".
Researchers report a robotic finger covered in a type of manufactured living human skin. Researchers demonstrate an electronic skin giving biological skin-like haptic sensations and touch/pain-sensitivity to a robotic hand (1 June). A system of an electronic skin and a human-machine interface is reported that can enable remote sensed tactile perception, and wearable or robotic sensing of many hazardous substances and pathogens (1 June). A multilayer tactile sensor hydrogel-based robot skin is demonstrated (8 June).
10 June – The core of the globular cluster NGC 3201 is shown to harbor a sub-cluster of nearly a hundred black holes. The same study also confirms that the globular cluster NGC 6397 has ejected most of its original black hole population, and its inner mass excess is composed by hundreds of massive white dwarfs.
13 June – Science and the 2022 Russian invasion of Ukraine:Groups of academics report how global science community could help Ukraine via an action plan, including for helping organizing (re)vitalization of Ukrainian science and reconstruction in the future. On the same day, a researcher outlined a number of possible major policy-based actions that could mitigate the energy and resource crises caused or exacerbated by the war. Russian space agency Roscosmos announces the intent to, unilaterally and hazardously, take over paused telescope eROSITA, launched in collaboration with Germany (4 June). A science journalist outlines some of the food system-related environmental impacts of the war (21 June). A study reports a number of humanitarian, economic, and financial impacts of the war (23 June).
15 June
Astronomers identify J1144 as the fastest-growing black hole of the last nine billion years, consuming matter equivalent to one Earth every second, as well as being the most luminous quasi-stellar object of that period.
Researchers report Lac-Phe as the most significantly induced circulating metabolite in two animal models of exercise which – including via chronic administration – reduces food intake and suppresses obesity.
20 June
A study suggests global food miles  emissions are 3.5–7.5 times higher than previously estimated, with transport accounting for about 19% of total food-system emissions, albeit shifting towards plant-based diets remains substantially more important.
Researchers demonstrate a MRI-ML-based approach that can diagnose early Alzheimer's disease  and may help identify unknown related changes in the brain.
21 June – The inability to stand on one leg for 10 seconds in mid to later life is linked to a near-doubling in the risk of death from any cause within the next 10 years.
22 June
A study concludes that the spread of breast cancer accelerates during sleep.
Agilicious, an open-source and open-hardware versatile standardized quadrotor drone, currently tailored toward agility, is released.
The world's first quantum computer integrated circuit is demonstrated.
23 June
The largest known bacterium, and an organism that has encapsulated DNA despite being identified as a prokaryote and not an eukaryote, T. magnifica is reported.
A review shows prevalence of long COVID conditions – like mood symptoms, fatigue and sleep disorders – in people age 0–18 years appears to be at ~25% overall.
Two studies about aging-related characteristics of long-lived animals like turtles are published, identifying potentially causal protective traits and suggesting many of the species have "slow or negligible senescence" (or aging).
Researchers report the controlled growth of diverse foods in the dark  as a potential way to increase energy efficiency of food production and reduce its environmental impacts.
24 June
NASA publishes images showing an unexpected and unexplained double crater from what is thought to be the first time human space debris – likely by a spent rocket body – unintentionally hit the lunar surface on 4 March.
Early 2022 monkeypox outbreak research:A study reports phylogenomic characterization of the first monkeypox (MP) virus outbreak genome sequences, finding the "presumably slow-evolving" DNA virus has evolved roughly 6–12-fold more mutations than one would expect and 15 SNP mutations since the beginning of the outbreak. The WHO announces that MP is not yet a global public health emergency but a cause for deep concern (25 June). Early overviews and reviews, including about current knowledge about MP prevention and treatment, are published. Scientists are investigating circulating lineages (and potential variants) of the MP virus and compare them to the African endemic lineages. A preprint suggests that cases "where a small fraction of individuals have disproportionately large numbers of partners, can explain the sustained growth of monkeypox cases among the MSM population" (13 June). The MP incubation period is estimated to be 8.5 days on average and up to 21 days (16 June). The 3D-folded structures of the whole proteome of the current DNA virus are predicted, which may be useful for the development of (better or updated) vaccines and drugs (28 June). A study indicates MP contaminated surfaces within hospitals and households could be infectious (30 June).
25 June – A study indicates that the Arctic is warming four times faster than global warming now, substantially faster than current CMIP6 models could project.
27 June
With  of unknown bacteria, researchers suggest work on microbes soon to be released from melting glaciers across the world to identify and understand potential threats in advance and understand extremophiles.
Progress in climate change mitigation (CCM) living review-like works:The living document-like aggregation, assessment, integration and review website Project Drawdown adds 11 new CCM solutions to its organized set of mitigation techniques. The website's modeling framework is used in a study document to show that metal recycling has significant potential for CCM (2 June). A revised or updated version of a major worldwide 100% renewable energy proposed plan and model is published (28 June).
28 June
Physicists report that interstellar quantum communication by other civilizations could be possible and may be advantageous, identifying some potential challenges and factors for detecting such. They may use, for example, X-ray photons for remotely established channels and quantum teleportation as the communication mode.
30 June
Samsung announces the first mass production of computer chips using a 3 nm process. These feature a gate-all-around transistor architecture that reduces power consumption by up to 45%, improves performance by 23% and reduces area by 16% compared to 5 nm.
Researchers, health organizations and regulators are discussing,  and partly recommending COVID-19 vaccine boosters that mix the original vaccine formulation with Omicron-adjusted parts – such as spike proteins of a specific Omicron subvariant – to better prepare the immune system to recognize a wide variety of variants amid substantial and ongoing immune evasion by Omicron.

July

1 July
Scientists show why climate benefits from nature restoration are "dwarfed by the scale of ongoing fossil fuel emissions".
5 July – The Large Hadron Collider commences its Run 3 physics season. The LHCb collaboration observes three never-before-seen particles: a new kind of "pentaquark" and the first-ever pair of "tetraquarks", which includes a new type of tetraquark.
6 July – A study suggests that the marginal effectiveness of a fourth COVID-19 vaccine dose (a second "booster") versus three doses can be 40% (24% to 52%) against severe disease outcomes. There is no scientific consensus about the efficacy and overall recommendabilities of a fourth dose. The CDC recommended such in March only for "certain immunocompromised individuals and people over the age of 50".

7 July
The first tandem perovskite-silicon solar cell to exceed 30% efficiency (31.25%) is independently certified by the National Renewable Energy Laboratory.
A study into the effects of a global nuclear war on the world's oceans is published, revealing a rapid  drop in temperature, along with many longer-lasting impacts.
8 July – Astronomers report the discovery of massive amounts of prebiotic molecules, including precursors for RNA, in the Galactic Center of the Milky Way Galaxy.
9 July – Researchers report the development of an efficient, secure and convenient method to separate, purify, store and transport large amounts of hydrogen for energy storage in renewables-based energy systems as powder using ball milling.
11 July
Researchers report the development of a deep learning system that learns intuitive physics from visual data (of virtual 3D environments) to some degree "from scratch" based on an unpublished approach inspired by studies of visual cognition in infants. On 25 July, other researchers report the development of a machine learning algorithm that could discover sets of basic variables of various physical systems and predict the systems' future dynamics from video recordings of their behavior.
News outlets report about the development of algae biopanels by a company for sustainable energy generation with unclear viability after other researchers built the self-powered  house prototype in 2013.
12 July – NASA releases the first suite of images from the now fully operational James Webb Space Telescope, a day after releasing the Webb's First Deep Field, the image of early universe with the highest resolution. On 14 July, NASA presents images of Jupiter and related areas captured, for the first time, and including infrared views, by the telescope. On 19 July, scientists report what could be the earliest and most distant galaxy ever discovered, GLASS-z12.
13 July
The discovery of fast radio burst FRB 20191221A with an unusually long duration of three seconds is reported.
A study affirms (see 7 March) that critical slowing down indicators suggest that tropical, arid and temperate forests are substantially losing resilience. On 4 July, Brazil's INPE reports that the country's regions of the Amazon rainforest have been deforested by a record amount in the first half of 2022.
A study shows that blood cells' , reportedly affecting at least 40% of 70 years-old men to some degree, contributes to fibrosis, heart risks, and mortality in a causal way.
Researchers report the development of semitransparent solar cells that are as large as windows, after team members achieved record efficiency with high transparency in 2020. On 4 July, researchers report the fabrication of solar cells with a record average visible transparency of 79%, being nearly invisible.

18 July 
A survey of more than 3,000 experts finds that the extinction crisis could be worse than previously thought, and estimates that roughly 30% of species "have been globally threatened or driven extinct since the year 1500."
The first "dormant" black hole (meaning it does not emit high levels of X-ray radiation) is identified outside the Milky Way. The object, with nine solar masses, orbits a rare O-type star in a system called VFTS 243 within the Large Magellanic Cloud.
A study shows that climate change-related exceptional marine heatwaves in the Mediterranean Sea during 2015–2019 resulted in widespread mass sealife die-offs in five consecutive years.
20 July – Scientists report that SARS-CoV-2 builds tunneling nanotubes from nose cells to gain access to the brain.
21 July
A potential gene therapy cure for haemophilia B, which corrects the genetic defect associated with the condition is announced with trial results by doctors. It caused a sustained increase in factor IX activity in 9 of 10 patients in the small trial.
Sunspot AR3060 explodes early in the morning. It releases a C-5 class solar flare, and a "solar tsunami". The NOAA predicts that a geomagnetic storm from this event will strike the Earth on 23 July, between 0000 UTC and 0400 UTC, as a G2 class storm, with a slight chance of a G3 storm. Aurorae could be visible as far south as 50° N latitude.
Researchers report the development of deep learning software that can design proteins that contain prespecified functional sites.
23 July – The World Health Organization (WHO) declares the recent monkeypox outbreak a Public Health Emergency of International Concern, as the number of reported cases worldwide exceeds 17,000. In July, scientists reported that the window to be able to contain the outbreak is closing or has closed. On 5 July, a preprint indicates there can be asymptomatic infections. On 27 July, an analysis of studies by a journalist indicates that "about 10-to-15% of cases have been hospitalized, mostly for pain and bacterial infections that can occur as a result of monkeypox lesions". Studies published in August indicated hospitalizations of small cohorts of early patients were 8% and 13%.
25 July
Researchers introduce  and demonstrate it by repurposing dead spiders as robotic grippers by activating their gripping arms via applying pressurized air.
Researchers review the scientific literature on 100% renewable energy, addressing various issues, outlining open research questions, and concluding there to be growing consensus, research and empirical evidence concerning its feasibility worldwide.
26 July – Scientists analyse 2.8 million of the sequenced SARS-CoV-2 genomes and use the results to compile a 'mutations blacklist' of virus weak spots, and a 'whitelist' of mutations that would make it more transmissible.
27 July – Progress towards a pan coronavirus vaccine is announced, following tests on mice. Antibodies targeting the S2 subunit of SARS-CoV-2's spike protein are found to neutralise multiple coronavirus variants.
28 July
DeepMind announces that its AlphaFold program has uncovered the structures of more than 200 million folded proteins, essentially all of those known to science.
Researchers report the development of a wearable bioadhesive stretchable high-resolution ultrasound imaging patch for days-long continuous imaging of diverse organs which may enable novel diagnostic and monitoring tools.
First reported discovery of an animal helping algae reproduce after pollination in the sea was first reported in 2016.
Researchers report the development of nanoscale brain-inspired artificial synapses, using the ion proton, for 'analog deep learning'.
Scientists report the discovery of chemical reactions by potential primordial soup components that produced amino acids and may be part of the origin of life on Earth.
29 July
In a preprint, scientists from the Galileo Project describe a planned expedition to retrieve small fragments of interstellar meteor CNEOS 2014-01-08, which "appears to be rare both in composition and in speed" and is not ruled out to be "extraterrestrial equipment", using a magnetic sled on the seafloor of the impact region.
A study, that reanalyzes data used in a study by DeSilva et al. (2021), indicates that human brain size did not decrease over the last three thousand years as suggested by this study nor within 300 ka as suggested by other studies. It concludes that "the samples need to be specific enough to test the hypothesis across different times and populations".

August

1 August
A meta-analysis of policy studies concludes that international treaties that aim to foster global cooperation have mostly failed to produce their intended effects in addressing global challenges, with the exception of international trade and finance regulations. The study suggests enforcement mechanisms are the "only modifiable treaty design choice" with the potential to improve the effectiveness.
The discovery of a super-Earth around the red dwarf star Ross 508 is reported. Part of the planet's elliptical orbit takes it within the habitable zone.
Researchers report that the risk of climate change (indirectly) resulting in worldwide societal collapse, or possibly eventual human extinction, is a "dangerously underexplored" global topic, despite there being indications of such being possible as worst-case scenarios and "integrated catastrophe assessment" missing.
In two separate studies – the other published on 25 August, two teams report  of synthetic embryos grown from mice embryonic stem cells (with the earlier published study also using other stem cell types), without sperm or eggs or a uteros, with natural-like development and some surviving until day 8.5 where early organogenesis, including formation of foundations of a brain, occurs. They grew in vitro and subsequently ex utero in an artificial womb.
2 August
Scientists conclude that the overall transgressed (see 18 January) planetary boundary for "novel entities" (NEs) is a placeholder for multiple different boundaries for NEs that may emerge, reporting that PFAS pollution is one such new boundary. They show that levels of these so-called "forever chemicals" in rainwater are ubiquitously, and often greatly, above guideline safe levels worldwide. There are moves to restrict and replace their use.On 18 August, a simple method of breaking down these chemicals once they have been pulled out of contaminated water or soil is described.
A preprint describes the donations-funded plans of The Galileo Project in detail: a systematic scientific research program searching for (signs of) extraterrestrial technological civilizations (ETCs) on and near Earth.
3 August – Scientists report an organ perfusion system that can restore, i.e. on the cellular level, multiple vital (pig) organs one hour after death (during which the body had warm ischaemia), after reporting a similar method/system for reviving (pig) brains hours after death in 2019. This could be used to preserve donor organs or for revival in medical emergencies.
4 August – Lab-made cartilage gel based on a synthetic hydrogel composite is found to have greater strength and wear resistance than natural cartilage, which could enable the durable resurfacing of damaged articulating joints.
8 August
Researchers provide a dataset of standardized calculated detailed environmental impacts of >57,000 circulating food products, potentially e.g. informing consumers or policy.
A study  the large extent of climate change impacts on infectious diseases.
The creation of artificial neurons that can receive and release dopamine (chemical signals rather than electrical signals) and communicate with natural rat muscle and brain cells is reported, with potential for use in BCIs/prosthetics.
A screening AI system for many cancer types that integrates different types of data via multimodal learning is reported.

10 August – 2022 monkeypox outbreak: Evidence of human-to-dog transmission is reported.On 4 August, a preprint reports that early post-exposure ring vaccination despite high efficacy "did not completely prevent breakthrough infections".On 15 August, a preprint suggests the virus has potential to infect .On 16 August, a review recommends a 'living guideline' framework for needed clinical management research.On 19 August, a CDC study summarizes current knowledge about the transmission of monkeypox.Wastewater surveillance, which substantially expanded during the COVID-19 pandemic is used to detect monkeypox, with one team of researchers describing their qualitative detection method on 31 August.

11 August – A bioengineered cornea made from pig's skin is shown to restore vision to blind people. It can be mass-produced and stored for up to two years, unlike donated human corneas that are scarce and must be used within two weeks.
12 August — The National Centers for Environmental Information publish , where they state an all-time record cold temperature occurred in Australia during the month. On October 7, 2022, Zack Labe, a climate scientist for the NOAA GFDL releases a statement and a climate report from Berkeley Earth denying the all-time record cold temperature occurred saying, "There are still no areas of record cold so far in 2022." Labe's statement also denies the record cold temperatures in Brazil, reported by the National Institute of Meteorology in May 2022, a month before the official start of winter, was also not record cold temperatures.
13 August – Rocket Lab describes its self-funded plans in detail, first announced in early 2020, to send a probe to Venus, likely in 2023, to search for life in the planet's cloud layer, where other scientists reported the potential detection of biosignature-levels of phosphine .
~14 August – As record-breaking heatwaves and droughts affect water supplies, rivers (along with shipping and nuclear reactor cooling), ecosystems, various global supply chains, health, and agriculture worldwide, in Europe, Spain domestically restricts e.g. air conditioning to defined temperature ranges, in the U.S., entities are required to provide plans to reduce their water usage, and China experiences large blackouts and experiments with cloud seeding among other measures, despite experts stating it would be "marginally effective" and possibly exacerbate problems. Several journalists of online newspapers have put these extreme weather events into the context of climate change adaptation (alongside highlighting of the importance of climate change mitigation).
15 August – A study on the food impacts of a nuclear war is published. It finds that even a small-scale conflict between India and Pakistan would decrease global average caloric production by 7%, while a full-scale U.S.-Russia nuclear conflict would result in a 90% loss, killing more than 5 billion people worldwide.

16 August – A university reports the release of 'Quad-SDK' which may be the first open source full-stack software for large agile four-legged robots, compatible with the ROS.
17 August
A report by Global Forest Watch, using new data, concludes that the amount of tree cover being burned has nearly doubled in the past 20 years.
The Nadir crater, likely the result of a second, smaller asteroid that struck , is identified and described by researchers.
Geologists warn that the world is "woefully underprepared" for a massive volcanic eruption. They estimate a one-in-six chance of a magnitude seven explosion in the next one hundred years.
Researchers report the development of floating artificial leaves for light-driven hydrogen and syngas fuel production. The lightweight, flexible devices are scalable and can float on water similar to lotus leaves.

18 August
A weak spot in the spike protein of SARS-CoV-2 is described by researchers, which an antibody fragment called VH Ab6 can attach to, potentially neutralising all major variants of the virus. On 11 August, researchers report a single antibody, SP1-77, that could potentially neutralize all known variants of the virus via a novel mechanism, not by not preventing the virus from binding to ACE2 receptors but by blocking it from fusing with host cells' membranes.
Multiple gene editing of soybean is shown to improve photosynthesis and boost yields by 20%.
A researcher reports that the social media app TikTok adds a keylogger to its, on iOS essentially unavoidable, in-app browser in iOS, which allows its Chinese company to gather, for example, passwords, credit card details, and everything else that is typed into websites opened from taps on any external links within the app. Shortly after the report, the company claims such capabilities are only used for debugging-types of purposes. To date, it has largely not been investigated which and to which extent (other) apps have capacities for such or similar data-collection.
A university reports the development of an invisible coating for fireproof wood.
20 August – A GBD systematic analysis reports the (non)progress on cancer and its causes during the 2010-19 decade, with ~44% of all cancer deaths in 2019 – or ~4.5 M deaths or ~105 million lost DALYs – due to known clearly preventable risk factors (contributions), led by smoking, alcohol use and high BMI.
22 August
A university reports the development of a driver isolation framework to protect operating system kernels, primarily the monolithic Linux kernel which gets ~80,000 commits/year to its drivers, from defects and vulnerabilities in device drivers, with the Mars Research Group developers describing this lack of isolation as one of the main factors undermining kernel security.
Scientists demonstrate that tACS brain stimulation can, depending on the frequency, for one month improve (either) short-term memory or long-term memory in 65–88-years-old people.
Scientists report a so far unique and unknown feature of material VO2 – it can "remember" previous external stimuli (via structural rather than electronic states), with potential for e.g. data storage.
A university reports the first successful transplantation of an organoid into a human, first announced on 7 July, with the underlying study being published in February.
23 August
A study reports that look-alike humans have genetic similarities, sharing genes affecting not only the face but also some phenotypes of physique and behavior, also indicating that (their) differences in the epigenome and microbiome contribute only modestly to human variability in facial appearance.
Researchers introduce the concept of 'false social reality' and substantiate it by showing that (a sample of) Americans widely underestimate general public support for climate change mitigation policies by a large margin.
A genome-wide association study meta-analysis reports genetic factors of, the so far uniquely human, language-related skills, in particular factors of differences in skill-levels of five tested traits. It e.g. identified association with neuroanatomy of a language-related brain area via neuroimaging correlation.
24 August
The dugong is declared extinct in China.
The first rail line entirely run by hydrogen-powered trains  in Germany.
25 August
The first clear evidence for carbon dioxide in the atmosphere of an exoplanet is revealed by the James Webb Space Telescope. The planet, WASP-39b, is a hot Jupiter located ~700 light years from Earth.
Researchers report the development of a highly effective CRISPR-Cas9 genome editing method without expensive viral vectors, enabling e.g. novel anti-cancer CAR-T cell therapies.
26 August – Researchers report the development of greenhouses (or solar modules) by a startup that generate electricity from a portion of the spectrum of sunlight, allowing spectra that interior plants use to pass through.
29 August
A study reports that in model animals, treatment with rapamycin – which typically has negative side-effects – for a limited timespan extended lifespan as much as life-long administration started at the same age and that it was most effective during early adulthood.
Scientists report the key molecular mechanisms of rejuvenation they found in a comparison of the newly presented genomes of the biologically immortal T. dohrnii and a similar but non-rejuvenating jellyfish, involving e.g. DNA replication and repair, and stem cell renewal.
After establishment of the Scientist Rebellion around March 2021, several researchers affiliated with the movement (six overall) argue for civil disobedience by colleagues in a commentary behind a paywall, hypothesizing that such may cause significant pro-climate net changes of public opinion due to "potential to cut through the myriad complexities and confusion" in the public, receiving substantial coverage by online text-based news media.
31 August
Scientists warn, in a follow-up paper to their 2021 study, that a third of tree species are threatened with extinction, showing how this will significantly alter the world's ecosystems, may negatively affect billions, and could get averted with "urgent actions". On 1 August, a study reports that over 60 years (1960–2019), "the global forest area has declined by 81.7 million ha", concluding higher income nations need to reduce imports of tropical forest-related products and help with theoretically forest-related socioeconomic development and international policies.
News outlets report artificial intelligence art has won the first place in a digital art competition. Such artistic imagery is generated using input consisting of text and sometimes images, usually including parameters such as artistic style (text-to-image generation). Around the time, an expert concludes that "AI art is everywhere right now", with even experts not knowing what it will mean, a news outlet establishes that "AI-generated art booms" and reports about issues of copyright and automation of professional artists, a news outlet investigates how online communities (e.g. their rules) confronted with many such artworks react, a news outlet raised concerns over deepfakes, a magazine highlights possibilities of enabling "new forms of artistic expression", an editorial notes that it may be seen as a welcome . Moreover, additional functionalities – such as enabling the use of user-provided concepts (like an object or a style) learned from few images for novel personalized art generated from the associated word/s (2 Aug) or expanding beyond the borders of artistic images in the same style (31 Aug) – are reported. On 22 August, Stable Diffusion is released as free and open source software.

September
1 September
The James Webb Space Telescope takes its first direct images of a planet beyond our Solar System. The exoplanet, HIP 65426 b, is revealed in different bands of infrared light.
Neuroscientists report the discovery of the axo-ciliary synapse – communication between serotonergic axons and antenna-like primary cilia of CA1 pyramidal neurons that .
Scientists elaborate a need for an evidence-based reform of regulation of genetically modified crops (moving from regulation based on characteristics of the development-process to characteristics of the product) in a paywalled article.
2 September – A first spatiotemporal map reveals key insights about axolotl brain regeneration.
5 September – Researchers report the development of remote controlled cyborg cockroaches  if moving to sunlight for recharging.
6 September – The U.S. Department of Agriculture approves a new purple tomato, genetically modified to alter its colour and enhance its nutritional quality.
7 September – A new malaria vaccine developed by the University of Oxford is shown to be ~80% effective at preventing the disease.
8 September – A study adds to the accumulating research indicating postexposure antiviral TIPs could be an effective countermeasure that reduces COVID-19 transmission. In September, India and China approve  first nasal COVID-19 vaccines which may (as boosters) also reduce transmission (sterilizing immunity).
9 September
A study describes how multiple tipping points in the climate system could be triggered if global warming exceeds 1.5 °C.
Scientists report a change in gene TKTL1 as a key factor of recent brain evolution and difference of modern humans to (other) apes and Neanderthals, related to neocortex-neurogenesis. Some of the scientists reported a similar ARHGAP11B mutation in 2016.
News outlets report about a study that describes a way by which geothermal power plants  within their reservoirs for dispatch to (better) help manage intermittency of solar and wind.
China reports the discovery of Changesite–(Y), a new mineral from lunar samples containing helium-3, widely seen as a potential fuel for fusion reactors.
12 September – A study investigates funding allocations for public investment in energy research, development and demonstration.
13 September
A study reports results indicating COVID-19 may significantly increase risk for Alzheimer's disease, similar to prior studies about long-term impacts besides long COVID on cardiovascular outcomes, diabetes, neurologic sequelae, mental health disorders, and general future mortality after COVID-19, including specific types of sequelae less commonly seen in other viral illnesses.
The United in Science 2022 report is published by the WMO, summarizing latest climate science-related updates and assessing recent climate change mitigation progress as "going in the wrong direction".
14 September
A new deep learning technique enables year-round measurements of sea ice thickness in the Arctic.
The WHO joins health associations and scientists in calling for a global fossil fuel non-proliferation treaty .

15 September
A geoengineering plan to refreeze the North and South Poles by spraying sulphur dioxide into the atmosphere, using a fleet of 125 military air-to-air refuelling tankers, is proposed by scientists.
A study shows the microbiome, on the level of strains, co-diversified in parallel to phylogenies (heritability from ancestry). The findings may be of relevance to microbiome interventions (such as probiotics) and for adjusting therapies to populations.
The second largest cryptocurrency, Ethereum, switches from the proof-of-work (electricity consumption for validation) to the proof-of-stake (staked holdings for validation) algorithm, which cuts its large respective electricity consumption.
Researchers describe a way by which the aging of select immune system T cells can be prevented or is slowed down, with relevance to life extension and making vaccines more durable.

19 September
A study indicates a substantial decline in dinosaur biodiversity millions of years before the Cretaceous-Paleogene extinction event.
Scientists report geochemical modeling results that increase confidence for the ocean of Saturn's moon Enceladus being habitable or meeting abiogenesis-requirements.

20 September – Scientists who reported the earliest known interstellar object, CNEOS 2014-01-08, and members of The Galileo Project, report the discovery of an additional candidate interstellar meteor, CNEOS 2017-03-09, in a preprint using the same fireball catalog. They find that  suggests that interstellar meteors "come from a population with material strength characteristically higher than meteors originating from within the solar system".
21 September – Engineers report the development of autonomous 3D-printing drones for construction and repair.
22 September
Nanoengineers report the development of biocompatible microalgae hybrid microrobots for active drug-delivery in the lungs (22 Sep.) and the gastrointestinal tract (GT) (28 Sep.). The microrobots are related to medical nanobots and proved effective in tests with mice. A separate team reports the development of 'RoboCap', a robotic drug delivery capsule that enhances drug absorption by tunneling through the mucus layer in the GT (28 Sep.).
Around September, news outlets report about deployment, research and development of novel military drone technology in the Russo-Ukrainian War in 2022, including demining drones, self-repurposed commercial/hobby drones (including via a hackathon), reconnaissance microdrones, kamikaze drones, bomb-dropping modified drones, and countermeasures such as electronic ones.
Scientists caution about potential spillover of bat sarbecovirus Khosta-2 resistant to COVID-19 vaccines and also using ACE2, suggesting it or something like it could recombine with SARS-CoV-2 as a new threat.
23 September – Astronomers report that GJ 1252b, an Earth-sized planet orbiting an M-class red dwarf, appears to have no atmosphere, which may reduce the chances of life emerging in such systems.
26 September
Jupiter makes its closest approach to Earth since 1963.
NASA's DART crashes into the asteroid Dimorphos in a first test of potential planetary defense. Success of path alteration is reported on 11 October.
A study invalidates the common argument  for high medication costs that research and development investments are reflected in and necessitate the treatment costs, finding no correlation for investments in drugs (for cases where transparency was sufficient) and their costs.
News outlets report, based on CDC reports and health officials, that the 2022 monkeypox outbreak appears to be receding and/or  while also reporting that its elimination within the U.S. and globally is unlikely (or the outbreak being "far from finished").
27 September – A study finds that drinking two to three cups of ground, instant, or decaffeinated coffee each day is associated with a longer lifespan and lower risk of cardiovascular disease compared with avoiding coffee.
28 September
A breakthrough in treating Alzheimer's disease is reported by pharmaceutical companies Eisai and Biogen, using a drug called lecanemab, which is designed to remove beta-amyloid proteins from the brain.
A study indicates cancer risk from chronic circadian disruption is caused via body-temperature-related heat shock factor 1.
Researchers report the discovery of hemoglycin, the first space polymer of amino acids found in meteorites.
29 September
In two studies, scientists report a novel way of cancer screening – detecting tumor-associated mycobiomes. It could be used in synergy with other biomarkers such as of bacterial microbiomes.
A study estimates the disproportionality of drivers of climate change by wealth and concludes that to total emissions, investments of the global top 1% are far more important than their consumption and that the pollution gap is larger within countries than between countries.
A study adds to the accumulating research showing that oil and gas industry methane emissions are much larger than thought.
30 September
The discovery of "super neurons" in the entorhinal cortex of people over age 80 who show exceptional episodic memory is reported.
Scientists caution about potential future spillover of SHFV.

October

1 October – A new simulation by NASA finds that the Moon likely formed within a matter of hours, as opposed to earlier theories that proposed a much longer period of months or years.
4 October – Edmonton Police Service reports the use of DNA phenotyping to generate 3D facial images of crime suspects.

5 October
The New York Times summarizes those awarded Nobel Prizes in the Sciences for the year 2022: 
Physiology or Medicine (October 3): Svante Pääbo for discoveries involving genomes of extinct hominins
Physics (October 4): Alain Aspect, John F. Clauser and Anton Zeilinger for work in quantum technology
Chemistry (October 5): Carolyn R. Bertozzi, Morten Meldal and K. Barry Sharpless for studies on click chemistry and bioorthogonal chemistry.
Scientists report the discovery of ongoing transfer of mitochondrial DNA into DNA in the cell nucleus. Previously, nuclear-mitochondrial segments (NUMT) were thought to have arisen . 66 thousand whole-genome sequences indicate this currently occurs as frequent as once in every ~4,000 human births.
Researchers outline the large potentials and benefits of marine algae-based aquaculture for the development of a future healthy and sustainable food system.
Scientists demonstrate the use of organoids for the study of brain development, identifying and investigating genetic switches that have a significant impact on it using single-cell transcriptome readouts.

6 October
An open source platform to match genomically profiled cancer patients to precision medicine drug trials is reported.
Neuroscientists report PFC-Hb connectivity white matter impairment in both cocaine and heroin addiction.
7 October
News outlets report about a study published on 28 September theorizing that the supercontinent Amasia will form within 300 million years when the Pacific Ocean closes.
Neuroscientists report experimental MRI results that so far appear to imply nuclear proton spins of 'brain water' in the brain were entangled, suggesting brain functions that operate non-classically which may support quantum mechanisms being involved in consciousness as the signal pattern declined when human participants fell asleep.
8 October – Researchers report recommendations concerning potential geopolitical implications of potential future information about or from extraterrestrial intelligence.

12 October
Researchers report successful transplantation of human brain tissue organoids into baby rats. Such research could eventually controversially raise ethical issues relating to (non-)human intelligence/consciousness/welfare and be used to model human brain development and, as demonstrated, to investigate diseases (and their potential therapies). Unlike in other recent studies, the tissues appeared to be highly functional, to mature and to integrate with the rat brain.
A study reports that in a cohort of symptomatically infected, 46% had only partially recovered after 12 months, that asymptomatic infection was not associated with adverse outcomes of long COVID and that vaccination was associated with reduced risk of seven long-term symptoms. A meta-analysis published on the same day reports substantial exercise intolerance more than 3 months after infection in long COVID-19 patients. It notes that postexertional malaise has been reported in long COVID-19 similar to CFS.
13 October
A novel synthetic biology-based process for recycling of plastics mixtures is presented.
Scientists report that in some cases, some apparently senescent cells – which are targeted by anti-aging senolytics – are required for regeneration.
14 October – Scientists from Boston University publish unauthorized (but legal) research on SARS-CoV-2 BA.1 Omicron via creation of a  recombinant virus as a preprint, described by "many" but not all as "irresponsible gain-of-function" research.
18 October – A study indicates there has been a substantial increase of sentiment negativity and decrease of emotional neutrality in headlines across written popular news media since 2000.
19 October – A novel type of effective hydrogen storage using readily available salts is reported.
20 October
A study of PNMN, the world's largest no-fishing zone, finds a "spillover benefit" for migratory species like bigeye and yellowfin tuna.
The first data transmission to exceed 1 petabit per second (Pbit/s) using only a single laser and a single optical chip is demonstrated by European researchers.
21 October – News outlets report about a novel agricultural robot for viable weed control using lasers or "laserweeding". There are similar precision agriculture machines that have been reported before, also e.g. applying low amounts of herbicides and fertilizers with precision while mapping plant locations, in some cases autonomously. Their benefits may include "healthier crops and soil, decreased herbicide use, and reduced chemical and labor costs".
24 October
The NHS launches 'Our Future Health', one of the world's largest health and genetic data gathering projects, aimed at building a long-term repository of information for researchers. Five million UK adults are invited to participate.
"Hybrid viral particles (HVPs)" are reported, combining IAV and RSV in vitro.
25 October – A comprehensive annually scheduled study finds climate change is "undermining every dimension of global health monitored" and reports dire conclusions from tracking of impact indicators.
26 October
In two studies, scientists report findings about the role of epigenetics – which is  – in colorectal cancer, including that it is a major component of how an individual tumor varies and findings about its influences on the accumulation of DNA mutations and cancer phenotypes.
At the 30th anniversary of the World Scientists' Warning to Humanity, scientists conclude that "We are now at 'code red' on planet Earth", facing a climate emergency, warning citizens and world leaders to take necessary actions with information about tracked "recent climate-related disasters, assess[ed] planetary vital signs, and [...] policy recommendations".
A study concludes that cosmic radiation events in the tree-ring radiocarbon record called "Miyake events", don't appear to be caused by the solar cycle (i.e. solar flares) as thought previously and have extended durations. They occurred every ~1,000 years on average and may threaten global technologies this century.
A magnetical guidance system with engineered bacterial microbots  for 'precision targeting' is demonstrated to be effective for fighting cancer in mice.
31 October
Multiple traces of monkeypox are detected in non-sewered wastewater with sparse sampling from a densely populated metropolitan area in Asia.
A new record for the longest-frozen embryos to ever result in a live birth is reported in the United States, with twins born after storage for 30 years.

November

1 November – A pooled analysis indicates that globally over half of all preschool-aged children and over two-thirds of all nonpregnant women of reproductive age are deficient in at least one of three micronutrients each. The study notes required data is scarce and such deficiencies can constrain physical and (neurocognitive) development and compromise health.
2 November – Scientists show that cells move faster in thicker (higher viscosity) fluids. Cancer cells can form memory of extracellular fluid, helping them to form distant cancerous colonies more efficiently when exposed to fluids of higher viscosities.
3 November – Astronomers using the IXPE space observatory report that 4U 0142+61, a magnetar found 13,000 light-years from Earth, likely has a solid surface with no atmosphere.
4 November – The discovery of Gaia BH1, a binary system containing what is likely the closest known black hole to Earth, is reported by astronomers in the U.S.
6–18 November – The 2022 United Nations Climate Change Conference (COP27) on climate change mitigation takes place in Sharm el-Sheikh, Egypt.
7 November
The first clinical trial of laboratory-grown red blood cells transfused into people begins.
Scientists warn about summarized effects of climate change on insects, among other novel stressors, which may "drastically reduce our ability to build a sustainable future based on healthy, functional ecosystems", providing several recommended mitigation options.
The development of organic artificial neurons that function in and with biological systems, partly  mimicking neurons' communication, is reported.
9 November
IBM unveils its 433-qubit 'Osprey' quantum processer, the successor to its Eagle system.
A study shows that 50+ aged users of the dietary program SNAP "had about 2 fewer years of cognitive aging over a 10-year period compared with non-users" despite it having nearly no conditions for the sustainability and healthiness of the food products purchased with the coupons (or coupon-credits).
10 November
A study describes how one may eventually be able to detect (distinguish) wormholes, suggesting they may have never been observed because they appear very similar to black holes.
Notable software developments:
After domain seizures of Z-Library by copyright law enforcement and moves toward dark web and IPFS technologies by its content providers, the open source shadow library UI Anna's Archive – which also provides access to a full copy of Z-Library content and scientific articles – is established by a team of archivists, essentially providing the largest human book and literature library.
News outlets report about the development of a post-editing model using GPT-3 that improves machine translations after identification of current translation problems (8 Nov/25 Oct).
The largest global inventory and interactive map of greenhouse gas emission sources is released by Climate TRACE (9 Nov).
Around the acquisition of Twitter by Elon Musk (27 Oct), interest in alternatives to the site – described as "one of the world's most high-profile information ecosystems", a contemporary suboptimal public square, and as heavily used by many journalists and news media – increases substantially. However, no alternative such as Mastodon, Reddit or the Bluesky protocol was found to match  such as ease of use to date, in terms of being able to substitute the site.
Two studies demonstrate platform-built-in as well browser-integrated misinformation mitigation (11 Nov).
Researchers develop falsity scores for over 800 contemporary elites on Twitter and associated exposure scores (21 Nov).
News outlets report about the first fully self-supervised anti-money laundering AI software using contemporary suboptimal datasets, LaundroGraph (24 Nov/26 Oct).
11 November – The Global Carbon Project reports that carbon emissions in 2022 remain at record levels, with no sign of the decrease that is needed to limit global warming to 1.5 °C. At the current rate, the carbon that can still be emitted while still meeting the 1.5 °C global goal will likely (at a 50% chance) be emitted within only around nine years.
12 November – Astronomers, using the Hubble Space Telescope, report the discovery of one of the most metal-poor galaxies known. This nearby dwarf galaxy, 20 million light-years away and 1,200 light-years across, is named HIPASS J1131–31 (nicknamed the "Peekaboo" galaxy).
14 November
Archaeologists report the oldest likely evidence (via heated fish teeth from a deep cave) of controlled use of fire to cook food by archaic humans ~780,000 years ago.
After being linked to risks for obesity, mental disorders, and potentially other health issues, a study finds a likely association between (contemporary types of) outdoor artificial light at night and diabetes.
15 November
A scientific review finds that human sperm counts fell by 62% in the last 50 years and are decreasing at an accelerating rate, likely a result of factors such as poor diets, endocrine disruptors in prevalent products, unhealthy lifestyles and toxic forever chemicals in air and water.
A study using neuroimaging identifies rapid GABA boosting as a major potential explanation-component for why learning is often more efficient in children.
Scientists report leprosy-causing bacteria viably regenerate and rejuvenate the liver in its armadillos hosts, which may enable novel human therapies.
16 November
NASA conducts the first uncrewed flight of its Space Launch System (SLS), the largest rocket in history. The onboard Orion capsule will orbit the Moon before returning to Earth, as a demonstration of planned human missions.
A satellite-free GPS-alternative higher-resolution positioning system using existing telecommunications networks is demonstrated, SuperGPS.

18 November – Researchers theorize that in many disciplines, larger scientific productivity or success by elite universities can be explained by their larger pool of available funded laborers. A commentary notes that academic rankings don't consider where (country and institute) the respective researchers were trained (1 Dec).
19 November – Researchers report determinants of alertness after waking up.
21 November
Scientists in Papua New Guinea record the black-naped pheasant pigeon for the first time in 140 years.
A GBD study reports the first global estimates of death rates from (33) bacterial pathogens, finding such infections are contributing to one in 8 deaths (or ~7.7 million deaths), which  the second largest cause of death globally in 2019.
A pulsed electric field-based shark and ray bycatch mitigation device is reported, SharkGuard.
22 November
The International Bureau of Weights and Measures announces it will phase out the leap second by 2035.
Photochemistry is confirmed on an exoplanet for the first time, as the James Webb Space Telescope detects a range of signatures including sulfur dioxide in the atmosphere of WASP-39b.
A cohort study indicates dietary intakes of total flavonols – and at least kaempferol- and quercetin-containing foods in specific – may substantially decrease decline in multiple cognitive abilities with older age, showing a difference of "0.4 units per decade" between 5 mg and 15 mg intakes.
23 November
 is demonstrated as a way of separating nanoparticles, especially small extracellular vesicles, from biofluids in under 10 minutes.
A study reports phages have a large variety of CRISPR-Cas systems. They possibly may use them to edit hosts' genes and for competitive advantages, e.g. against rival phages. These systems could be useful for CRISPR-Cas gene editing.
A study reports estimated contemporary prevalence and associations with belief in witchcraft around the world, which (in their data) varied between 9% and 90% between nations and is still a widespread element in worldviews globally. It also shows associations such as with low "innovative activity", lower life expectancy and high religiosity.
24 November
Promising results of therapeutic candidates are reported:a universal flu mRNA vaccine, a phase 3 trialed RSV vaccine (1 Nov), phase 3 trialed antibiotic gepotidacin against UTIs (3 Nov), phase I trialed new antibiotic for gram-negative bacteria QPX9003 (20 Oct/9 Nov), phase 2 trialed antibody CIS43LS against malaria (17 Nov), phase 2 trialed acoziborole against African sleeping sickness parasites (29 Nov), and phase 3 trialed lecanemab against Alzheimer's disease (29 Nov).
A new CRISPR-Cas9 gene editing tool for large edits without problematic double-stranded breaks is demonstrated, .
29 November
Canadian mineralogists discover two , Elkinstantonite and Elaliite, on the 15-tonne El Ali meteorite that grounded in Somalia.
A study maps common disease combinations or multimorbidity patterns, a "growing public health problem worldwide".
30 November
An electrolysis system for viable hydrogen production from seawater without requiring a pre-desalination process, which could make it less flexible and more costly, is reported.
A study deploying protein imaging of adult mice suggests adult brains contain, at the tips of filopodia, many (~30% of all dendritic protrusions) "silent synapses" that are inactive until recruited as part of neural plasticity and flexible learning or memories, previously thought to be present mainly in the developing pre-adult brain and to die off with time.
Scientists develop a quantum experiment allowing the observation of a kind of theoretical wormhole in a SYK "baby" physical model which some, but not all, consider potentially useful for the development of quantum gravity theories.

December

1 December
Astronomers using the James Webb Space Telescope report viewing clouds, likely made of methane, moving across Saturn's moon Titan.
Genomic epidemiologists report results from a global survey of antimicrobial resistance (AMR) via genomic wastewater-based epidemiology, finding large regional variations, providing maps, and suggesting resistance genes are also passed on between microbial species that are not closely related. On 9 December, the WHO's fifth  report summarizes 2020 data on inter-national AMR, including various new features and an interactive dashboard.
Scientists report the measurement of the highest toughness ever recorded, of any material, while investigating a metallic alloy made of chromium, cobalt, and nickel.
4 December – Chemical engineers report a method to substantially increase conversion efficiency and reduce material costs of green hydrogen production by using sound waves during electrolysis.
5 December
Construction begins on the Square Kilometer Array, the largest telescope in history.
Health/eco-economics:
A study projects the costs of inaction on physical inactivity in terms of number of cases of preventable major NCDs and healthcare system finances.
Results of a trial investigating financial incentives for health, in particular for weight loss, are reported (5 Dec).
Researchers provide first estimates of global costs of inadequate pollination (14 Dec).
Results of a trial on effects of climate change impact menu labels on fast food ordering choices (27 Dec).

6 December
They found cold exposure impairs extracellular vesicle (EV) swarm–mediated antiviral immunity in the nose – fewer EVs are secreted and they become less effective.
Impossible Metals announces its first underwater robotic vehicle, 'Eureka 1', has completed its first trial of selectively harvesting polymetallic nodule rocks from the seabed nearly without harming the environment (as with other seabed mining) to help address the rising global need for metals for renewable energy system components, mainly batteries.
Researchers propose "significantly increasing freshwater through the capture of humid air over oceans" to address present and, especially, future water scarcity/insecurity.
 Emulate researchers assess advantages of using liver-chips predicting drug-induced liver injury which could reduce the high costs and time needed in drug development workflows/pipelines, sometimes described as the pharmaceutical industry's "productivity crisis".
An astronomer concludes that the first interstellar probe to transit between two civilizations is not likely to be the civilization's earliest but a more advanced one as (at least) the departure speed is thought to (likely) improve for at least some duration per each civilization, which may be relevant to the interpretation of UAP via their "flight characteristics".
7 December
Scientists report that two-million years old genetic material was found in Greenland, and is currently considered the oldest DNA discovered so far.
Scientists propose a new supergroup of eukaryotes, termed Provora – predators of other microorganisms which have been overlooked due to numerical rarity.
8 December
Astronomers report in a preprint the possible detection of the earliest first stars, technically referred to as Population III stars.
In a paywalled article, American scientists propose policy-based measures to reduce large risks from life sciences research – such as pandemics through accident or misapplication. Risk management measures may include novel international guidelines, effective oversight, improvement of US policies to influence policies globally, and identification of gaps in biosecurity policies along with potential approaches to address them.
9 December
Researchers report the development of a blood test, for Alzheimer's screening via levels of toxic amyloid beta oligomers with sensitivity and specificity of apparently 99%. On 27 December, a separate study reports another well-performing blood test to detect Alzheimer's disease via biomarker brain-derived tau.
Anti-aging research:
A study indicates that aging shifts activity toward short genes or shorter transcript length and that this can be countered by interventions.
A paywalled study reports higher percentage of daily energy consumption of ultraprocessed foods, such as white bread or instant noodles, was associated with faster cognitive decline in aging. Differences can be as large or larger than a 28% faster rate of global cognitive decline (5 Dec).
Scientists report that sphingolipids accumulate in muscle during aging whose genetic inhibition or ceramide-blockers such as myriocin could counteract, reducing associated muscle loss (16 Dec).
By stimulating (or charging) genetically engineered roundworm mitochondria with light, researchers show that halting the decline in mitochondrial membrane potential can slow aging (30 Dec).
Researchers report the development of 3D-printed flexible paper-thin organic photovoltaics.
12 December – Scientists describe a new method to break up so-called "forever chemicals" by infusing contaminated water with hydrogen, then blasting it with high-energy, short-wavelength ultraviolet light.
13 December
The Newborn Genomes Programme is announced by the UK government. It will conduct whole genome sequencing of 100,000 newborns, the largest study of its kind in the world, to aid research into the diagnosis and treatment of rare genetic conditions.
In a major milestone for the field, scientists at the National Ignition Facility report a net energy gain in the development of fusion power.
COVID-19 pandemic: A study finds that the BQ and XBB subvariants of SARS-CoV-2 are "barely susceptible to neutralization" by vaccines, including the new Omicron boosters. Key antibody drugs, Evusheld and bebtelovimab, are "completely inactive" against the new subvariants. This could result in a surge of breakthrough infections and reinfections, according to the study team, although the vaccines hold up against severe disease.
A study systematically assesses advice given by professional general practitioners, typically in the form of verbal-only consultation, for weight-loss to obese patients. They found it rarely included effective methods, was mostly generic, and was rarely tailored to patients' existing knowledge and behaviours.
14 December
A WHO study comprehensively estimates excess deaths from the COVID-19 pandemic during 2020 and 2021, concluding ~14.8 million excess early deaths occurred, reaffirming their prior calculations from May as well as updating them, addressing criticisms. These numbers do not include measures like years of potential life lost, far exceed the 5.42 million officially reported deaths, may make COVID-19 2021's leading cause of death, and are similar to the ~18 million estimated by another study .
Microbiome research:
Researchers report the discovery of a gut–brain connection in mice that regulates motivation for exercise and can enhance performance by augmenting dopamine signalling during physical activity.
A microbiome-wide association study associates thirteen microbial taxa with depressive symptoms (6 Dec).
Scientists report that and how – including transfer of mobile genetic elements and infant diet – the maternal microbiome shapes offspring gut microbiomes as fetus and infant (22 Dec).
A first global review summarizes scarce data on a likely largely declining "experience of nature" and nature-disconnection which prior studies suggest have impacts on health and proenvironmental behavior.
A university reports on the first study (25 Oct) of the new privacy-intrusion Web tracking technique of "UID smuggling" by the ad industry, which finds it to be prevalent and largely not mitigated by latest protection tools – such as Firefox's tracking protection and uBlock Origin – and contributes to countermeasures.
15 December
Astronomers find that a pair of exoplanets orbiting the red dwarf star Kepler-138 are likely to be water worlds.
News reports about the development (22 Oct) in China of an edible, plant-based ink derived from food waste, which could be used in 3D printing of scaffolds to reduce the cost of cultured meat.
Promising results of therapeutic candidates are reported: phase 2-trialed talquetamab against multiple myeloma (10&15 Dec), a phase 1-trialed HIV vaccine (2 Dec), mice-tested Pillar[6]MaxQ against meth and fentanyl drug overdoses (15 Dec), first approval of a trialed honeybee vaccine against American foulbrood (29 Dec), a mice-tested triple combination therapy against pancreatic cancer of immunotherapy medications undergoing trials as monotherapies (30 Dec).
19 December – A new world record solar cell efficiency for a silicon-perovskite tandem solar cell is achieved, with scientists in Germany converting 32.5% of sunlight into electrical energy.
20 December – OpenAI releases Point-E, a machine learning system that can generate 3D models from text prompts (text-to-3D), similar to previously released GET3D and Magic3D by Nvidia and DreamFusion by Google.
22 December
A network model analysis suggests that temporary overshoots of climate change – increasing global temperature beyond Paris Agreement goals temporarily as often projected – can increase risks of climate tipping cascades "by up to 72%".
In a paywalled article, scientists provide 3D imaging and model analysis to reveal main causes, mechanics, and potential mitigations of the problematic prevalent lithium-ion battery degradation over charge cycles.
26 December – Bio- and electrical engineers prove for the first time that human cerebral organoids transplanted into mice  functionally integrate with their visual cortex.
27 December – Scientists report that a species of Halteria, a single-celled protozoan, is the first known organism for which "a virus-only diet ... is enough to fuel the physiological growth and even population growth".

Awards

5 July – The Fields Medal in mathematics is awarded to Hugo Duminil-Copin, June Huh, James Maynard and Maryna Viazovska.
2 December – Winners of the Earthshot Prize are announded, established in 2021 and awarded for developments useful for international climate change mitigation and sustainability goals.

Deaths

 1 April – Gerhard J. Woeginger, Austrian mathematician.
 5 April – Sidney Altman, Canadian-American molecular biologist, Nobel Prize laureate (1989).
 5 April – Bjarni Tryggvason, Icelandic-born Canadian astronaut (STS-85).
 5 April – Eelco Visser, Dutch computer scientist.
 5 April – Leslie Young, New Zealand economist.
 1 May – Ray Freeman, British chemist.
 1 May – Dominique Lecourt, French philosopher.
 2 May – Joseph Raz, Israeli philosopher. 
 4 May – Amanda Claridge, Canadian archaeologist.
 7 May – Sir Paul Mellars, British archaeologist.
 8 May – Harry Dornbrand, American aerospace engineer.
 8 May – Zhuang Qiaosheng, Chinese geneticist and wheat breeder, member of the Chinese Academy of Sciences.
 9 May – John H. Coates, Australian mathematician.
 14 May – Bernard Bigot, French physicist and civil servant, director general of ITER (b. 1950)
 9 June – Gordon M. Shepherd, American neuroscientist.
 26 July – James Lovelock, English environmentalist (Gaia hypothesis) and futurist (b. 1919)
 25 August – Kurt Gottfried, Austrian-born American physicist.
 2 September – Frank Drake, American astronomer and astrophysicist (Drake equation), designer of the Arecibo message (b. 1930)
 9 December – Ademar José Gevaerd, Brazilian ufologist (b. 1962)

See also

 2020s#Global goals and issues
 :Category:Science events
 :Category:Science timelines
 List of emerging technologies
 List of years in science

References

External links

2022 in science
21st century in science
2020s in technology
2022-related lists
Science
Science timelines by year

de:2022 in der Wissenschaft und Technik